The Outlast Trials is an upcoming first-person psychological horror survival video game developed and published by Red Barrels. It is the third installment in the Outlast series, serving as a prequel to the first two games and features test subjects in a mysterious Cold War experiment. The game is scheduled to be released on May 18, 2023 via early access for Microsoft Windows.

Gameplay
The Outlast Trials is a survival horror game played from a first-person perspective. While the game supports four-player cooperative multiplayer, players can complete the game solo. The player must complete a set of tasks while evading monstrous enemies. The game features four distinct character classes and skill trees. Each class has a unique ability, allowing players to perform actions such as seeing through walls, healing other players, placing mines, and throwing a device to temporarily stun enemies.

The player has an access to a pair of night-vision goggles, allowing them to navigate dim-lit areas. It needs to be regularly recharged with a scarce battery resource. Players can pick up various useful objects, such as anti-psychotic drugs, lockpicks and healing items, but they can only carry three items at once. The player cannot directly fight against enemies, and stealth is the preferred way to progress in the game.

Development
Outlast 3 was announced in December 2017, though no time frame or target platforms were confirmed. During this announcement, Red Barrels said that because they could not easily add downloadable content for Outlast 2 due to its structure, they have a smaller separate project related to Outlast that will release before Outlast 3. Red Barrels also described the game as a "TV series". The development team of the game had around 40 people.

The Outlast Trials was teased in October 2019 and is not a direct sequel to Outlast 2. It is about test subjects for the Murkoff Corporation in a mysterious Cold War experiment that is set in the same universe of the previous games. Red Barrels co-founder David Chateauneuf said "the proof-of-concept is now complete and the game's team is now in development mode".

Marketing
On December 4, 2019, Red Barrels released a teaser image of the game. On June 13, 2020, a teaser trailer was released, announcing a release for 2021. However, it was announced in August 2021 that the game has been delayed to 2022 due to the COVID-19 pandemic. To help pass the time, Red Barrels released a series of "Behind The Scenes" videos on their official YouTube channel. A closed beta for the game was available from October 28 to November 1, 2022. While the game was only confirmed for Microsoft Windows, the game would also be released for undisclosed PlayStation platforms "in the future". Despite delaying the game to 2022, Red Barrels has yet to announce a release date as of 2023; but on March 10, 2023, it was announced that the game will be released in early access on May 18.

References

External links
 

Upcoming video games
Cold War video games
Multiplayer and single-player video games
Psychological horror games
Psychological thriller video games
Red Barrels games
Survival video games
Indie video games
Unreal Engine games
Video game prequels
Video games developed in Canada
Video games postponed due to the COVID-19 pandemic
Windows games